Huber is an unincorporated community in Washington County, Oregon, United States, now mostly located within Aloha near the Tualatin Hills Nature Park.

History
Huber was established in 1910. It is named for Jacob Huber, an early resident of the area. The Huber post office opened in 1916 and was closed on December 31, 1953.

References

Unincorporated communities in Washington County, Oregon
Unincorporated communities in Oregon
1910 establishments in Oregon
Populated places established in 1910
Portland metropolitan area